Barış Ergüden (born 1 January 1986) is a Turkish tennis player.

Ergüden has a career high ATP singles ranking of 520 achieved on 15 June 2015. He also has a career high ATP doubles ranking of 532, achieved on 16 June 2014. 
 
Ergüden has represented Turkey at Davis Cup, where he has a win–loss record of 8–9.

Career titles

External links 
 
 
 

1986 births
Living people
Sportspeople from Istanbul
Turkish male tennis players
21st-century Turkish people